Macrorhizodus is an extinct genus of Mackerel shark which lived during the early to middle Eocene epoch of the Paleogene period. It is often considered ancestral to Isurus and sometimes considered part of it. Macrorhizodus is also likely ancestral to Cosmopolitodus. It seems to be related to Isurolamna. It is known from isolated teeth and vertebral centra as well as at least two associated dentitions. It is an incredibly widespread shark, known from every continent except Australia. This includes a report from Antarctica.

Species
The genus is composed of the following species:

This genus appears to have undergone anagenesis, making it difficult to draw lines between species. Some authors prefer to lump and others to split.  The early Oligocene species Macrorhizodus flandricus ascribed to this genus now usually considered to be a synonym of Isurus desori, sometimes styled Isurus desori flandrica. However, I. desori might itself be a junior synonym to I. oxyrhincus. This confusion stems from the proximity of Macrorhizodus to Isurus.

References

Lamnidae
Prehistoric shark genera
Eocene sharks